Gordana Boban (born 13 September 1967) is a Bosnian actress. She graduated in Academy of Performing Arts in Sarajevo in class of professor Boro Stjepanović.

Currently, she is acting in Kamerni teatar 55, theater in Sarajevo.

Early life

Since early childhood, she was a member of the Cultural-Art Society "Radnik" from Livno, during which she appeared in several roles of Amateur Theater Livno during the 1980s.

Filmography
Films
Mliječni put (2000)
Gori vatra (2003)
Nafaka (2006)
Kenjac (2006)

Television

Lud, zbunjen, normalan (2007-2009)

References

External links

1967 births
Living people
Bosnia and Herzegovina film actresses
Bosnia and Herzegovina television actresses
21st-century Bosnia and Herzegovina actresses
Croats of Bosnia and Herzegovina
People from Livno